Stary Biser is an urban locality (an urban-type settlement) in Gornozavodsky District of Perm Krai, Russia. Population:

History 
Stary Biser was founded in 1787 during the construction of an iron foundry that existed to the beginning of the XX century. In the 1920s it was used as a basis for a shop of the shaped iron casting of the Teplogorsk Casting and Mechanical Plant.

In the settlement, there are two sites of the Biser Teplogorskiy factory (XVII-XIX cent.) and a house where the prominent activist of the RSDLP(b) Sergeyev lived.

In 1926, owing to the full exhaustion of local mines, the melting of pig-iron at Biserka metallurgical plant was stopped, and the plant itself was closed.

An urban-type settlement from 27 August 1928.

References

Urban-type settlements in Perm Krai